WDFC-FM 101.7 is a low power non-commercial educational radio station broadcasting from Greensboro, North Carolina. Owned by Christ United Methodist Church and with an all-volunteer staff,  Christ Church Radio operates 24/7 with a very unusual type format featuring classical music on Monday, Wednesday, Friday, Sunday and Jazz/Smooth Jazz on Tuesday and Thursday. Variety programs are featured on Saturday. The station operates as a hands on educational school for training students interested in going into communications and broadcasting. Memories in Melodies begins at 8 pm on Tuesday and  Jazz with Gil follows at 9 pm. Andees Favorite Music is a variety show featuring Folk Music and other types on Thursday evenings at 9 pm.  50s, 60s, 70s music is programmed on Saturday afternoon from noon to 2:00 pm to 5:00 with Charting in the USA. Beach music,"On the Beach with Charlie Brown" is presented from 5pm to 8pm Saturday evening and a combination of swing and jazz on Saturday evening with Simply Timeless beginning at 8 pm. The station switches to 24/7 Christmas music in mid-November and continues through the 12 days of Christmas ending on January 5. The Christmas programming is unique and features much more than what is normally heard during the Christmas season on other outlets. "The Seven Weeks of Christmas" contains both sacred and secular songs and features many songs not heard on most stations. Mixed in with the Classical music programming is sacred music from all over the world by famous composers. Support for Christ Church Radio comes from the Greensboro Symphony, Music for a Great Space, Bel Canto, Industries of the Blind as well as various business firms, non-profit organizations, and individuals. Contributions to WDFC Radio. a 501c3 are tax deductible. WDFC-FM is a strong local supporter of the arts in Guilford County.

Special shows featured during the week include:  Animal Radio, Blind Talk Radio, The People's Pharmacy, With Heart & Voice, Sing for Joy, Cool Jazz Weekly, Simply Timeless, Music and the Spoken Word, Day 1, Live Broadcast of Christ Church 11 am Sunday Service, Picture Perfect, Between the Keys, The Lost Chord, Memories in Melodies, daily devotionals from the Upper Room and others. WDFC intentionally strives to be "Radio That's Different" sounding quite different from other stations with our multiple formats and features.  Programming offers something for most everyone with the large variety of shows available.

References

External links

Christ Church Radio

DFC-LP
DFC-LP
Radio stations established in 2015
2015 establishments in North Carolina
Radio stations in Piedmont Triad